Southern Rain is the sixth studio album by American country music artist Billy Ray Cyrus released October 17, 2000.   album sold 14,000 copies in its first week of release and would go on to sell over 160,000 copies. It produced five singles on the Hot Country Songs charts, including the number 17 "You Won't Be Lonely Now". This was his first album for Monument Records after leaving Mercury Records in 1999.

Critical reception

A writer for About.com said, "Billy Ray fans will love this album, and those who may know Billy Ray only from "Achy Breaky Heart" should give him a chance to show that he's more than just a one-hit wonder. He's got a lot more to give, and he gives it here on Southern Rain." William Ruhlmann of AllMusic wrote that it was "a sturdy collection of average country songs effectively performed by a minor country talent. All of which was fine, unless you were hoping for an album that measured up to Cyrus' early sales figures, which, of course, Monument was." Alanna Nash of Entertainment Weekly said, "[I]f he gets nearly swallowed up in the power-pop ballads, he shines on the roots rockers — proof that underneath his lightweight, Chippendale reputation, there’s an artist dying to get out." A writer for People called the record "standard Cyrus, which means much of it sounds like the work of a frustrated heavy metal singer." The tracks "Hey Elvis", "We the People", "Love You Back" and "Burn Down the Trailer Park" were picked as highlights.

Track listing

Personnel
Adapted from Southern Rain liner notes.

Technical
Jeff Balding - recording (all tracks except 11), mastering
Blake Chancey - production (tracks 3-6, 9, 10 only)
Billy Ray Cyrus - production (track 11 only)
Dann Huff - production (all tracks except 11)
Mike Janas - recording (track 11 only)
Terry Shelton - production (track 11 only)

Musicians on all tracks except 11
Tim Akers - keyboards
Matt Basford - electric guitar on "We the People"
Mike Brignardello - bass guitar
Pat Buchanan - electric guitar, acoustic guitar (tracks 3-6, 9, 10 only)
Joe Chemay - background vocals (tracks 3-6, 9, 10 only)
Lisa Cochran - background vocals
Eric Darken - percussion
Paul Franklin - steel guitar
Vicki Hampton - background vocals
Dann Huff - electric guitar, acoustic guitar
Gordon Kennedy - electric guitar, acoustic guitar
Chris McHugh - drums
Gene Miller - background vocals
Steve Nathan - keyboards
Michael Joe Sagraves - harmonica on "Southern Rain"

Musicians on Track 11
Billy Ray Cyrus - background vocals
Steve French - drums, background vocals
Keith Hinton - electric guitar
Corky Holbrook - bass guitar
Michael Joe Sagraves - electric guitar
Terry Shelton - acoustic guitar, electric guitar
Barton Stevens - keyboards
Don Von Tress - acoustic guitar

Chart performance

Album

Singles

A "You Won't Be Lonely Now" reached #33 when RPM Country Tracks cessed production.

References

2000 albums
Billy Ray Cyrus albums
Monument Records albums
Albums produced by Dann Huff